Dylan James Fletcher-Scott  (born 3 April 1988) is a British sailor and Olympic Champion in Men's 49er in Tokyo 2020. Fletcher and Alain Sign placed sixth in the 49er event at the 2016 Summer Olympics.

Starting sailing at age 11 and racing at 13, Fletcher has always sailed double handers. Quickly finding himself at the front of the 405 fleet he moved up into the 29er enjoying similar success including 2nd at the Senior 29er worlds in 2006 (Weymouth). He then transitioned into the 49er climbing up the ranks collecting medals along the way.

Fletcher now sails with Olympic 2012 470 Silver medalist Stuart Bithell. The team medalled at every regatta in 2017 winning both the European and World Championships. They have qualified to represent Great Britain at the 2020 Summer Olympics in the Men's 49er class.

Fletcher won Olympic gold representing Great Britain at the 2020 Summer Olympics in the Men's 49er class with crew Stuart Bithell.

Fletcher was appointed Member of the Order of the British Empire (MBE) in the 2022 New Year Honours for services to sailing.

References

External links
 
 
 
 

1988 births
Living people
British male sailors (sport)
Olympic sailors of Great Britain
Olympic gold medallists for Great Britain
Olympic medalists in sailing
Sailors at the 2016 Summer Olympics – 49er
Sailors at the 2020 Summer Olympics – 49er
Medalists at the 2020 Summer Olympics
49er class world champions
World champions in sailing for Great Britain
People from Market Harborough
Sportspeople from Leicestershire
Members of the Order of the British Empire